Guinness Nigeria, a subsidiary of Diageo Plc of the United Kingdom, was incorporated in 1962 with the building of a brewery in Ikeja, the heart of Lagos. The brewery was the first Guinness operation outside Ireland and Great Britain. Other breweries have been opened over time: Ogba brewery in 1963 and Benin City brewery in 1973.

History 
Guinness product was sold in Nigeria in the 1940s and 1950s by United Africa Company (UAC) and the country soon became an important export market for the firm. In 1961, plans came into fruition between Arthur Guinness Son and Co and UAC to establish a brewery at Ikeja, Lagos.  Arthur Guinness first factory outside Ireland and the UK was built by Taylor Woodrow. The initial plant had the annual capacity to brew 75 million bottles or 150,000 barrels of beer. The plant area had a 15 million capacity bottle bin and office block designed by the firm of Godwin and Hopwood.

Products
Guinness Nigeria produces the following beer brands:
 Foreign Extra Stout (1962), 7.5% ABV (varies),
 Harp Lager Beer (1974), 5.15% ABV,
 Guinness Extra Smooth (2005) 6% ABV,
 Satzenbrau (November 2006),
 Harp Lime (2012) – discontinued.
 Armstrong Black Lager – discontinued
 Dubic Extra Lager (April 2012) 5% ABV,

The RTD (ready-to-drink) products include:
 Gordon's Spark (2001) – discontinued, 
 Smirnoff Ice (September 2006)5.5% ABV,
 SNAPP (September 2012) 5% ABV,
 Orijin (August 2013) 6%ABV

The popular malta (soft drink) drink range includes:
 Malta Guinness (1990),
 Malta Guinness Low Sugar (May 2012)

Community Investment
Guinness Nigeria Plc's Water of Life initiative currently provides potable water to over 500,000 Nigerians spread across several rural communities, from Northern to Southern Nigeria. It funds scholarship and provides Guinness Eye Hospitals in three cities in Nigeria.

See also

 List of beer and breweries in Nigeria

References

External links
 Guinness Nigeria official website
 Guinness official site
 Tasting notes for Foreign Extra Stout
Guinness Nigerial plc at Alacrastore
Guinness Nigeria at Google finance
Guinness Nigeria at Nigerian Stock Exchange 

Breweries in Nigeria
Companies listed on the Nigerian Stock Exchange
Manufacturing companies based in Lagos
Diageo
Nigerian subsidiaries of foreign companies